Helicia lewisensis is a species of rainforest trees, of northeastern Queensland, Australia, from the flowering plant family Proteaceae. It is endemic to the northern upland rainforests of the Wet Tropics region, from about  altitude.

 this species has the official, current, Qld government conservation status of "vulnerable" species.

References

lewisensis
Proteales of Australia
Flora of Queensland